Susan Douglas McGreivy (née Gray; October 24, 1939 – November 30, 2019) was an American competition swimmer who represented the United States at the 1956 Summer Olympics in Melbourne, Australia.  She competed in the preliminary heats of the women's 400-meter freestyle, and posted a time of 5:16.7.

McGreivy became a lesbian activist and civil rights attorney for the American Civil Liberties Union (ACLU) of Southern California.  She had a "leading role" in a range of ACLU gay and lesbian civil rights issues, including a case against the Boy Scouts of America, a defense of the Gay Games against the United States Olympic Committee, and defense of the Norton Sound Eight.

References

1939 births
2019 deaths
Lesbian sportswomen
American female freestyle swimmers
American LGBT sportspeople
Olympic swimmers of the United States
Swimmers from San Diego
Swimmers at the 1955 Pan American Games
Swimmers at the 1956 Summer Olympics
LGBT people from California
LGBT swimmers
Pan American Games competitors for the United States
21st-century American women